

Ancient period
 Achaemenid coinage
 Drachma
 Seleucid coinage
 Parthian coinage
 Sasanian coinage

Islamic period
Arab–Sasanian coinage
THE SAFAVID PERIOD 1502-1722
THE AFSHARID AND ZAND PERIOD 1722-94
THE QAJAR PERIOD 1779-1925

Economic history of Iran